Phenix Township is one of twenty-four townships in Henry County, Illinois, USA.  As of the 2010 census, its population was 1,672 and it contained 654 housing units.

Geography

Unincorporated towns
 Shady Beach at 
(This list is based on USGS data and may include former settlements.)

Adjacent townships
 Portland Township, Whiteside County (northeast)
 Loraine Township (east)
 Atkinson Township (southeast)
 Geneseo Township (south)
 Hanna Township (west)
 Zuma Township, Rock Island County (west)
 Canoe Creek Township, Rock Island County (northwest)

Cemeteries
The township contains these three cemeteries: Ebenezer, McHenry and Pink Prairie.

Major highways
  Illinois Route 82
  Illinois Route 92

Airports and landing strips
 Kazuma Airport
 Ropp Airpark

Lakes
 Shadow Lake

Demographics

School districts
 Erie Community Unit School District 1
 Geneseo Community Unit School District 228

Political districts
 Illinois's 14th congressional district
 State House District 90
 State Senate District 45

References

External links 

 City-Data.com
 Illinois State Archives
 Township Officials of Illinois

Townships in Henry County, Illinois
Townships in Illinois